Grazie is the nineteenth album by Italian pop singer, Gianna Nannini. It was released in 2006. As of 2006, the album has sold 400,000 copies in Italy.

Track listing

"Sei Nell'Anima" (Gianna Nannini, Gianna Nannini/L. De Crescenzo) - 4:29
"Possiamo Sempre" (Gianna Nannini/Wil Malone, Gianna Nannini/Isabella Santacroce) - 4:23
"L'Abbandono" (Gianna Nannini/Wil Malone, Gianna Nannini/Isabella Santacroce) - 4:01
"Grazie" (Francesco Sartori/Gianna Nannini, Gianna Nannini/Isabella Santacroce) - 3:31
"Le Carezze" (Wil Malone, L. De Crescenzo) - 4:10
"Babbino Caro" (Gianna Nannini) - 4:37
"Treno Bis" (Gianna Nannini) - 2:56
"Io" (Gianna Nannini, Gianna Nannini/Isabella Santacroce) - 4:37
"Mi Fai Incazzare" (Gianna Nannini) - 4:13
"Alla Fine" (Gianna Nannini) - 4:37

Personnel 

Gianna Nannini – vocals, guitar, choir, drum sound
Wil Malone – strings, grand piano, choir
Davide Tagliapietra – guitar
Rudiger Elze – guitar
Fausto Mesolella – guitar
Camilo Sampaolo – guitar
Hans Maahn – bass
Lino De Rosa – bass
Thomas Lang – drums
Sasha Ring – sound effects, groove
Francesco Sartori – grand piano
Ani Martirosyan – grand piano
I Piccoli Cantori di Milano – choir
Giulia Santaroni – choir, speaker
Delay Lama – choir
Production: Wil Malone and Gianna Nannini
Sound engineers: Charlie Bohaimid, Philippe Rose
Vocal engineers: Charlie Bohaimid, Raffaele Stefani
Mixing: Pino Pischetola
Mastering: Tony Cousins at Metropolis Studios, London
Photography - Steven Sebring
Art direction and design: Alberto Bettinetti

References

External links
 Gianna Nannini homepage

2006 albums
Gianna Nannini albums